The United States Virgin Islands competed at the 2002 Winter Olympics in Salt Lake City, United States.

Bobsleigh

Men

Luge

Women

References
 Official Olympic Reports
 Olympic Winter Games 2002, full results by sports-reference.com

External links
 

Nations at the 2002 Winter Olympics
Winter Olympics
2002 Winter Olympics